Naseem Bagh is a Mughal garden built on the northwestern side of the Dal Lake, close to the city of Srinagar in Jammu and Kashmir, India.

The garden is one of the oldest Mughal gardens in Kashmir, built by Mughal emperor Akbar in 1586. Over 1200 chinar trees were planted in 1686 by Shah Jahan. It is developed as Chinar Heritage Park by the University of Kashmir. At present the park houses around 700 chinar trees. It is mostly visited in the autumn from September to December.

See also
 Foreshore Road
 Indo-Islamic Architecture
 Dal Lake
 Shalimar Bagh (Srinagar)
 Hazratbal

References

Mughal gardens in India
Gardens in Jammu and Kashmir
Tourist attractions in Srinagar
Persian gardens in India
Srinagar district